Methylprednisolone acetate, sold under the brand names Depo-Medrol among others, is a synthetic glucocorticoid corticosteroid and a corticosteroid ester—specifically the C21 acetate ester of methylprednisolone—which is used in clinical and veterinary medicine. It has been formulated as an aqueous suspension for intramuscular, intra-articular, soft tissue, and intralesional injection alone and in combination with lidocaine, a local anesthetic. Methylprednisolone acetate was previously suspended with polyethylene glycol but is no longer formulated with this excipient due to concerns about possible toxicity. Depo methylprednisolone acetate is a depot injection and is absorbed slowly with a duration of weeks to months with a single intramuscular injection.

See also
 List of corticosteroid esters § Methylprednisolone esters

References

Acetate esters
Alcohols
Corticosteroid esters
Glucocorticoids
Ketones
Pregnanes